Dolbeau-Saint-Félicien Airport  Aéroport Dolbeau-St-Félicien, is located  southwest of Dolbeau-Mistassini, Quebec, Canada.

The airport had scheduled passenger airline service in the past: in 1985, Nordair was operating nonstop flights to Montreal Dorval Airport (now Trudeau International Airport) every weekday with Fairchild Hiller FH-227 turboprop aircraft.

References

Saint-Félicien, Quebec
Registered aerodromes in Saguenay–Lac-Saint-Jean
Dolbeau-Mistassini